Thomas Irwin Roulston (born November 20, 1957) is a Canadian former professional ice hockey right winger.  He was drafted by the St. Louis Blues in the third round, 45th overall, of the 1977 NHL amateur draft.  He was also drafted by the World Hockey Association's Quebec Nordiques in the 1977 WHA Amateur Draft (third round, 29th overall); however, he never played in that league.

Roulston appeared in 195 regular-season National Hockey League games with the Edmonton Oilers and Pittsburgh Penguins.  He scored 47 goals and 49 assists.

Career statistics

Awards and achievements 
CHL First All-Star Team (1981)

External links

1957 births
Living people
Baltimore Skipjacks players
Canadian ice hockey right wingers
Dallas Black Hawks players
EC Red Bull Salzburg players
Edmonton Oil Kings (WCHL) players
Edmonton Oilers players
EV Landshut players
HC Davos players
HC Fiemme Cavalese players
Houston Apollos players
Eishockey-Bundesliga players
Ice hockey people from Winnipeg
Pittsburgh Penguins players
Port Huron Flags (IHL) players
Quebec Nordiques (WHA) draft picks
St. Louis Blues draft picks
Salt Lake Golden Eagles (CHL) players
Starbulls Rosenheim players
Wichita Thunder players
Wichita Wind players
Winnipeg Clubs players
Winnipeg Monarchs players
Canadian expatriate ice hockey players in Austria
Canadian expatriate ice hockey players in Italy
Canadian expatriate ice hockey players in Germany
Canadian expatriate ice hockey players in Switzerland
Canadian expatriate ice hockey players in the United States